Redwater Creek is a stream in the U.S. states of South Dakota and Wyoming.

Redwater Creek The creek's name comes from the Sioux Indians of the area, for the red color of the river water.

See also
List of rivers of South Dakota
List of rivers of Wyoming

References

Rivers of Butte County, South Dakota
Rivers of Lawrence County, South Dakota
Rivers of Crook County, Wyoming
Rivers of South Dakota
Rivers of Wyoming